Miles Feinstein (born June 25, 1941) is an American criminal law defense attorney, and legal commentator, who has tried many high profile criminal cases. Feinstein is Jewish.

Notable cases

Present cases

Miles Feinstein presently represents Giuseppe "Juicy Joe" Giudice of the Real Housewives of New Jersey in his false driver's license case.

Feinstein also presently represents Ausar Walcott, a former NFL linebacker with the Cleveland Browns, who is charged with attempted murder due to an incident in June 2013 at a bar in Passaic, New Jersey.

Murder Acquittals

Feinstein has tried numerous homicide trials in his career of over forty-five years.  The acquittals include State v. Paul Kavanaugh  [not guilty of capital murder], State v. John DeGroot  [not guilty of capital murder], and State v. Vidovic [on cross-examination, star witness against Feinstein's client admitted that he, the witness, committed the murder and the defendant was acquitted].

Feinstein represented a key recanting witness which led to the reversal of a murder conviction in the case of Rubin "Hurricane" Carter.

Glen Ridge Rape

Miles Feinstein represented Kyle Scherzer in the appeal of the notorious Glen Ridge High School rape case, which received national attention and spawned a book "Our Guys" by Bernard Lefkowitz, a television movie Our Guys, Outrage in Glen Ridge, 
along with many newspaper, magazine and law review articles.

Organized Crime

Feinstein has represented many high-profile organized crime defendants for over forty-five years, including Joseph "Scoops" Licata (one of the defendants in the United States v.  Anthony Accetturo case), the longest federal trial in United States history., depicted in the Vin Diesel film Find Me Guilty and in the Book, The Boys From New Jersey.; reputed organized crime figures Nicodemo Scarfo, Genovese Family Capo regime Angelo Prisco, and Anthony DeVingo, a fearsome, but likeable, hit man for the Genovese Mob in the 1970s and 80s, said to be the inspiration for Paulie Walnuts in The Sopranos.

Legal Commentary

Feinstein appears as a legal commentator on television (Court TV; now TruTV) and is often quoted as an expert on criminal law in many publications.

Miles Feinstein is a frequent lecturer in continuing education courses for attorneys.

Feinstein has been named to New Jersey Super Lawyers for each year since its inception.

References

External links
 Feinstein website

1941 births
Living people
People from Camden, New Jersey
People from Clifton, New Jersey
New Jersey lawyers
Criminal defense lawyers
Rutgers University alumni
Duke University School of Law alumni